National Tertiary Route 761, or just Route 761 (or ) is a National Road Route of Costa Rica, located in the Alajuela province.

Description
In Alajuela province the route covers San Carlos canton (Pocosol district), Los Chiles canton (San Jorge district).

References

Highways in Costa Rica